Rohrberg may refer to:

Places

Rohrberg, Austria, a municipality in Zillertal, Schwaz district in Tyrol, Austria
Rohrberg, Saxony-Anhalt, a municipality in the Altmarkkreis Salzwedel district, Saxony-Anhalt, Germany
Rohrberg, Thuringia, a municipality in the Eichsfeld district, Thuringia, Germany
Rohrberg (Habichtswald), a hill in Hesse, Germany

People

Sebastian Rohrberg, a German archer